Dumbarton is a town in Scotland. It may also refer to:

Associations with Scotland
The County of Dumbarton in Scotland
Dumbarton (Scottish Parliament constituency)
Dumbarton (UK Parliament constituency), a former UK Parliament constituency.
Dumbarton (district), the local authority which covered the town and surrounding area between 1975 and 1996.
Dumbarton F.C., a Scottish Second Division football (soccer) team
The "Kingdom of Dumbarton" is a description of the Kingdom of Strathclyde, a post-Roman kingdom based on Dumbarton Rock and the valley of the River Clyde in Britain, absorbed into the Kingdom of Scotland in the 11th Century.

Associations with the New World
Dumbarton, Western Australia, locality near Toodyay, Western Australia
Dumbarton Parish, New Brunswick a civil parish in Canada
Dumbarton Bridge (California), a bridge across the San Francisco Bay in California
Dumbarton Bridge (Washington, D.C.), a bridge across Rock Creek Park in Washington, D.C.
Dumbarton Oaks, in Georgetown, Washington, D.C.
Dumbarton House, in Georgetown, Washington, D.C.
Concerto in E-flat (Dumbarton Oaks), a 1938 concerto by Igor Stravinsky
Dumbarton Oaks Conference, the meeting where the United Nations was formulated and negotiated
Dumbarton, Virginia, a census-designated place and neighborhood in Henrico County, Virginia

Title
 Earl of Dumbarton, title for son of Prince Harry

See also
Dumbarton Castle
HMS Dumbarton Castle, the name of a number of warships
Dunbarton (disambiguation)